Gabriel Marques de Andrade Pinto (born March 4, 1988 in Pedro Leopoldo), commonly known as Gabriel Marques, is a Brazilian footballer who plays as a centre-midfield for Guayaquil City in the Ecuadorian Serie A.

Honours
Nacional
Uruguayan Primera División: 2010–11
Barcelona SC
Serie A (1): 2020

External links
 
 

1988 births
Living people
Brazilian footballers
Brazilian expatriate footballers
Uruguayan Primera División players
Grêmio Foot-Ball Porto Alegrense players
Club Nacional de Football players
Club Atlético River Plate (Montevideo) players
Club Athletico Paranaense players
Paraná Clube players
Expatriate footballers in Uruguay
Barcelona S.C.
Expatriate footballers in Ecuador
People from Pedro Leopoldo
Association football defenders
Sportspeople from Minas Gerais